Bardini is a surname. Notable people with the surname include:

Aleksander Bardini (1913–1995), Polish theatre and opera director, actor, and professor
Gaetano Bardini (1926–2017), Italian tenor
Lorenzo Bardini (born 1996), Italian footballer
Samanta Bardini (born 1977), Italian softball player
Stefano Bardini (1836–1922), Italian connoisseur and art dealer